Air Vermont was a commuter airline in the United States based in Morrisville, Vermont. It was established in 1981 but suspended operations in 1984. It served several airports that are no longer served by scheduled airline service.

Destinations 
Connecticut
Bridgeport (Igor I. Sikorsky Memorial Airport)*
Hartford/Springfield (Bradley International Airport)
District of Columbia
Washington
Maine
Portland (Portland International Jetport)
Massachusetts
Boston (Logan International Airport)
Nantucket (Nantucket Memorial Airport)
Pittsfield (Pittsfield Municipal Airport)*
Worcester (Worcester Regional Airport)
New Hampshire
Berlin (Berlin Municipal Airport)*
Lebanon (Lebanon Municipal Airport)
New York
Albany (Albany International Airport)
Long Island/Islip (Long Island MacArthur Airport)
New York (John F. Kennedy International Airport)
Pennsylvania
Wilkes-Barre/Scranton (Wilkes-Barre/Scranton International Airport)
Vermont
Burlington (Burlington International Airport)
Morrisville-Stowe (Morrisville-Stowe State Airport)*
Montpelier (Edward F. Knapp State Airport)*
Newport (Newport State Airport)*
Those airports marked with an asterisk (*) are no longer served by scheduled airline service.

See also
 List of defunct airlines of the United States

Fleet
2 – Beech C99 Commuter

References

External links
AirTimes.com
Airline Timetable Images
DepartedFlights.com

Defunct airlines of the United States
Airlines established in 1981
Airlines disestablished in 1984
Defunct companies based in Vermont
Stowe, Vermont
American companies established in 1981
American companies disestablished in 1984
Airlines based in Vermont